The 2018 Canadian U18 Curling Championships was held from April 9 to 14 at the W.C. O'Neill Arena Complex and Heather Curling Club in Saint Andrews, New Brunswick.

Men

Round Robin Standings

Final Round Robin Standings

Knockout round

Source:

A Bracket

B Bracket

Playoffs

Semifinals

Bronze medal game

Final

Women

Round Robin Standings

Final Round Robin Standings

Knockout round

Source:

A Bracket

B Bracket

Playoffs

Semifinals

Bronze medal game

Final

References

External links

U18 Championships
Canadian U18 Curling Championships, 2018
2018 in New Brunswick
April 2018 sports events in Canada
Saint Andrews, New Brunswick